Sarhal Qazian is a village in Shaheed Bhagat Singh Nagar district of Punjab State, India. The village is administrated by Sarpanch an elected representative of the village.

Demography 
As of 2011, Sarhal Qazian has a total number of 329 houses and population of 1543 of which 790 include are males while 753 are females according to the report published by Census India in 2011. The literacy rate of Sarhal Qazian is 77.10% higher than the state average of 75.84%. The population of children under the age of 6 years is 150 which is 9.72% of total population of Sarhal Qazian, and child sex ratio is approximately 1113 as compared to Punjab state average of 846.

Most of the people are from Schedule Caste which constitutes 80.23% of total population in Sarhal Qazian. The town does not have any Schedule Tribe population so far.

As per the report published by Census India in 2011, 478 people were engaged in work activities out of the total population of Sarhal Qazian which includes 437 males and 41 females. According to census survey report 2011, 90.38% workers describe their work as main work and 9.62% workers are involved in Marginal activity providing livelihood for less than 6 months.

Education 
The village has two elementary schools and one Senior Secondary school for grade 6 through 12 . Amardeep Singh Shergill Memorial college Mukandpur are the nearest colleges.

List of schools nearby
Govt Upper Primary School, Katt
Govt Upper Primary with Secondary School, Khan Khana (girls only)
Govt Primary School, Khan Khana (boys only)
Govt Upper Primary School, Sotran

Transport 

See also 
List of villages in India

References

External links 
 Tourism of Punjab
 Census of Punjab
 Locality Based PINCode

Villages in Shaheed Bhagat Singh Nagar district